Sir Guy Stephen Montague Green,  (born 26 July 1937) is a retired Australian judge who served as the Governor of Tasmania from 1995 to 2003. He was the first Tasmanian-born governor of the state, although not the first Australian-born.

Early life and career
Guy Green was born in Launceston, Tasmania, and attended the Launceston Church Grammar School. He studied law at the University of Tasmania's Hobart Campus, graduating with honours in 1960. He was Chief Justice of Tasmania from 1973 until 1995, the culmination of a distinguished career in law in Tasmania, which saw him serve as a magistrate from 1971 to 1973.

Green was also heavily involved in the University of Tasmania, serving as chancellor before his appointment as governor. He was awarded an honorary Doctor of Laws by the university in 1996. Sir Guy was also chancellor of the Australian Priory of the Order of St John of Jerusalem before assuming Vice-Regal office.

On 11 May 2003, the Governor-General, Peter Hollingworth, stood aside following a controversy about his past handling of child abuse allegations. Green, the longest-serving state governor, was appointed Administrator of the Commonwealth, or in effect acting governor-general. Hollingworth later announced that he would not be returning to the position. Green served as administrator until Michael Jeffery took office in August 2003. He retired afterwards and was replaced as Tasmanian governor by Richard Butler.

Green was knighted as a Knight Commander of the Order of the British Empire in 1982, appointed a Companion of the Order of Australia in 1994, and appointed a Commander of the Royal Victorian Order during Queen Elizabeth II's visit to Tasmania in 2000. He was awarded the Centenary Medal in 2001.

On retiring from the governorship, Green continued to contribute to Tasmania, as chairman of trustees of the Tasmanian Museum and Art Gallery, and chairman of the board of the 10 Days on the Island festival.

Green was appointed (1975–1980) as a board director of the Duke of Edinburgh's International Award – Australia and during this period was the Tasmanian Chair for the Award.

Honours, awards and styles
Guy Green (1939–1973)
The Hon. Guy Green (1973–1982)
The Hon. Sir Guy Green, KBE (1982–1994)
The Hon. Sir Guy Green, AC, KBE (1994–1995)
His Excellency the Hon. Sir Guy Green, AC, KBE, 24th Governor of Tasmania (1995–2000)
His Excellency the Hon. Sir Guy Green, AC, KBE, CVO, 24th Governor of Tasmania (2000–2003)
The Hon. Sir Guy Green, AC, KBE, CVO (2003–Present)

References

1937 births
Living people
Governors of Tasmania
Chief Justices of Tasmania
Judges of the Supreme Court of Tasmania
20th-century Australian judges
Companions of the Order of Australia
Australian Knights Commander of the Order of the British Empire
Australian Commanders of the Royal Victorian Order
Recipients of the Centenary Medal
People educated at Launceston Church Grammar School
Australian monarchists